Francis Baring may refer to:
Sir Francis Baring, 1st Baronet (1740–1810), English merchant banker
Francis Baring, 1st Baron Northbrook (1796–1866), British politician 
Francis Baring, 2nd Earl of Northbrook (1850–1929), British politician 
Francis Baring, 3rd Baron Ashburton (1800–1868), British peer and politician
Francis Baring, 5th Baron Ashburton (1866–1938), British peer and politician
Francis Baring, 6th Baron Northbrook (born 1954), British peer and Conservative politician